Sammy Mandell (a.k.a. Samuel Mandella; February 5, 1904 – November 7, 1967) was an American World lightweight boxing champion from 1926-1930. Born in Rockford, Illinois, and named Salvatore Mandala, he was known as the "Rockford Sheik" due to his Rudolph Valentino like good looks and as the "Rockford Flash" due to his fast hands and foot speed. His father was an Albanian and his mother Italian.  Statistical boxing website BoxRec ranks Mandell as the 13th greatest lightweight boxer to have ever lived. He was inducted into the International Boxing Hall of Fame in 1998.

Amateur career

Mandell developed his fighting skills at the Camp Grant barracks in Rockford, Illinois. He was too young and underweight to join the army, weighing 105 lbs. Despite this, his persistence in hanging around the wrestling and boxing training areas saw him gain permission to join in with the military personnel. The camp boxing instructor at the time was Fred Dyer, "The Singing Boxer," who recalled in a 1926 interview how Mandell beat every soldier in the bantamweight class and was able to best men 10 lbs heavier than him. Dyer also stated that he advised Mandell to turn professional.

Pro career
On July 17, 1925, future champion Mandell fought Solly Seeman in East Chicago, Indiana.  Seeman knocked down Mandell in the first round, and in the opinion of many ringside had the edge throughout the bout.

Trained by the legendary Jack Blackburn, Mandell was an outstanding, clever fighter who carried a solid punch, fast hands and superb defensive skills. He won the championship when he outpointed Rocky Kansas on July 3, 1926. He successfully defended his crown against four contenders, including against hall of famers and future champions Tony Canzoneri and Jimmy McLarnin. In a startling upset, Mandell lost the crown when he was KOed by Al Singer in the first round.

Professional boxing record
All information in this section is derived from BoxRec, unless otherwise stated.

Official record

All newspaper decisions are officially regarded as “no decision” bouts and are not counted to the win/loss/draw column.

Unofficial record

Record with the inclusion of newspaper decisions to the win/loss/draw column.

See also
Lineal championship
List of lightweight boxing champions

Notes

External links

Cyber Boxing Zone - Sammy Mandell

|-

  

1904 births
1967 deaths
Boxers from Illinois
American people of Italian descent
Lightweight boxers
International Boxing Hall of Fame inductees
American male boxers